Taltita  is a Syrian village located in Kafr Takharim Nahiyah in Harem District, Idlib.  According to the Syria Central Bureau of Statistics (CBS), Taltita had a population of 487 in the 2004 census. It is a Druze village of the Jabal al-Sumaq region.

References 

Populated places in Harem District